Odysseus Naphtali Alfa (born 9 March 1999) is a Nigerian professional footballer who plays as a forward for Chelmsford City on loan from Queens Park Rangers.

Career
Alfa signed for Queens Park Rangers in 2013 at the age of 14.

On 24 August 2021, Alfa was named in the squad for a second round EFL Cup game against Oxford United, he came off the bench on the 75th minute to made his senior QPR debut.

In January 2019, Alfa signed a new 18-month contract with QPR and joined Spanish side Atlético Baleares on loan for the rest of the season.

On 27 September 2019, Alfa joined National League South side Billericay Town on loan, during his time there he scored six goals.

On 16 January 2020, Alfa joined National League side Maidenhead United on loan, during his time there he made eight appearances and scored three goals.

On 9 February 2022, Alfa joined Dartford on loan for the remainder of the 2021–22 season.

On 13 September 2022, Alfa, along with QPR teammate Faysal Bettache, joined National League club Aldershot Town on a three-month loan deal.

On 3 February 2023, following the ending of his loan to Aldershot, Alfa signed for Chelmsford City on loan until the end of the season.

References

External links

Living people
1999 births
Sportspeople from Kaduna
Nigerian footballers
English footballers
Association football forwards
Queens Park Rangers F.C. players
CD Atlético Baleares footballers
Billericay Town F.C. players
Maidenhead United F.C. players
Dartford F.C. players
Aldershot Town F.C. players
Chelmsford City F.C. players
National League (English football) players
Segunda División B players
English Football League players
Expatriate footballers in Spain
English expatriate footballers
English expatriate sportspeople in Spain
Nigerian expatriate footballers
Nigerian expatriate sportspeople in Spain